Ben Aziz Dao (born 8 July 1999) is a Burkinabé professional footballer who plays for Turan Tovuz.

International career
Dao represented Burkina Faso at 2019 African Games, where his team won the gold medals.

References

External links 
 
 

1999 births
Living people
Burkinabé footballers
Burkinabé expatriate footballers
21st-century Burkinabé people
Expatriate footballers in Ghana
Expatriate footballers in Guinea
Expatriate footballers in Belarus
Expatriate footballers in Azerbaijan
Burkina Faso under-20 international footballers
Association football defenders
Santos FC Ouagadougou footballers
AS Douanes (Burkina Faso) players
AS Kaloum Star players
FC Slutsk players
FC Smorgon players
Salitas FC players
Turan-Tovuz IK players